The FIS Nordic World Ski Championships 1935 took place February 13–18, 1935 in Vysoké Tatry, Czechoslovakia.

Men's cross country

18 km 
February 15, 1935

50 km 
February 17, 1935

4 × 10 km relay
February 18, 1935

Men's Nordic combined

Individual 
February 13, 1935

Men's ski jumping

Individual large hill 
February 13, 1935

Medal table

References
FIS 1935 Cross country results
FIS 1935 Nordic combined results
FIS 1935 Ski jumping results
Results from German Wikipedia
Hansen, Hermann & Sveen, Knut. (1996) VM på ski '97. Alt om ski-VM 1925-1997 Trondheim: Adresseavisens Forlag. p. 51. . 

FIS Nordic World Ski Championships
1935 in Nordic combined
International sports competitions hosted by Czechoslovakia
1935 in Czechoslovak sport
Skiing competitions in Czechoslovakia
February 1935 sports events
Nordic skiing competitions in Czechoslovakia